Stadio Giuseppe Capozza is an arena in Casarano, Italy.  It is primarily used for football, and is the home to the Virtus Casarano of the Serie D. It opened in 1956 and holds 6,500 spectators.

References

Football venues in Italy